Paul Christophe (born 10 February 1971) is a French politician who has represented Nord's 14th constituency in the National Assembly since 2017.

Early life 
Christophe was born in Les Sables-d'Olonne in the department of Vendée.

Career 
In 2015, Christophe was appointed to the local information commission of the Gravelines Nuclear Power Station.

Christophe was elected in the 2017 French parliamentary election as a Republican in Nord's 14th constituency. In parliament, he has since been serving on the Committee on Social Affairs.

In November 2017, Christophe joined the new Agir party.

References

External links 
 Biography at the website of the French Parliament

Living people
1971 births
Deputies of the 15th National Assembly of the French Fifth Republic
The Republicans (France) politicians
Agir (France) politicians
People from Nord (French department)
People from Dunkirk
People from Les Sables-d'Olonne
Deputies of the 16th National Assembly of the French Fifth Republic